Green Mansion House is a historic home located at Kenton, Kent County, Delaware.  The house dates to the first quarter of the 19th century, and consists of two sections.  The frame section is a two-story, three bay, center hall plan structure.  Attached to it is a two-story, two bay stuccoed brick wing.  The house was built as part of Philip Lewis' plan for the development of Kenton.

It was listed on the National Register of Historic Places in 1983.

References

Houses on the National Register of Historic Places in Delaware
Houses in Kent County, Delaware
Kenton, Delaware
National Register of Historic Places in Kent County, Delaware